Qalehchi-ye Bala (also Romanized as Qal‘ehchī-ye Bālā; also known as Qalāchī-ye ‘Olyā and Qal‘ehchī-ye ‘Olyā) is a village in Nahr-e Mian Rural District, Zalian District, Shazand County, Markazi Province, Iran. At the 2006 census, its population was 478, in 121 families.

References 

Populated places in Shazand County